Eli is the fourth studio album by the Serbian alternative rock band Supernaut, released by Automatik Records in 2006. The album, for which the cover was designed by Srđan Marković "Đile", was elected the fifth best album of the year 2006 on the webzine Popboks annual list. The album featured guest appearance by former Profili Profili and Laibach drummer Dragoslav Radojković "Draža".

Track listing

Personnel
 Srđan Marković "Đile" (vocals, guitar, sequenced by [drums])
 Saša Radić (bass guitar)
 Dragoslav Radojković (drums on tracks 5, 7, and 11)

References

External links
 EX YU ROCK enciklopedija 1960-2006, Janjatović Petar; 
 Eli at Discogs
 Eli at Rateyourmusic

Supernaut (Serbian band) albums
2006 albums
Serbian-language albums